Snuggy may refer to:

Wedgie
Sleeved blanket
Snuggy (Pillow Pal), Pillow Pal bear made by Ty, Inc.
Baby sling